Hoppipolla is a South Korean band formed in JTBC survival show Superband in 2019 and the winner of the show. Their band name,  which was taken from the Sigur Rós song of the same name means “jumping into puddles” in Icelandic, is about "Hoping people around the world can immerse in their music and feel bliss by getting solace". The band consists of two vocalists, a cellist and a guitarist: I'll, Ha Hyun-sang, Hong Jin-ho and Kim Young-so respectively. They made their debut on November 16, 2019 with the single album "About Time".

Members
I'll - Vocalist, keyboard
Hong Jin-ho (홍진호) - Cellist
Ha Hyun-sang (하현상) - Vocalist, guitar
Kim Young-so (김영소) - Guitarist

Discography

Extended plays

Single albums

References

External links 
 

South Korean rock music groups
Musical groups established in 2019
2019 establishments in South Korea
South Korean pop rock music groups